Aseel Omran is a Saudi Arabian singer who rose to fame when she entered the reality show Gulf Stars and Heya wa Huwa. She has signed onto Rotana, the Arab world's largest record label.

Aseel Omran was born on November 12, 1982, in Khobar. Her family is from Qatif and moved to Muscat because her father was working in the military. She is the sister of media presenter Lojain Omran. She entered the reality TV show Gulf Stars to spark her rise to stardom. Later on, she married the Bahraini television broadcaster Khaled Al-Shaer. Omran's young age and baby-face made her the first youth star in Saudi Arabia.

She is said to have a charismatic personality and a unique talent according to her fans, who are always chasing her news. On July 25, 2007, she released her first album entitled Khajlanah. The album introduced her to a larger audience. In 2008, she released her second album Allah Yhannini, produced and distributed by the Saudi label Rotana Records.

On September 23, 2010, the Middle East Broadcasting Center (MBC) started airing the first reality show Huwa Wa Heya (He & She), which is a 24/7 view of Aseel Omran and her husband Khaled Alsaher's day to day actions. In 2011, she released her third album Mo Bessahel".

On June 9, 2016, Omran in collaboration with RedOne released a music video of "Don't You Need Somebody". The song catapulted Omran to the top of Arabic music charts.

Discography

Studio albums
2007: Khajlanah
2008: Allah Yhannini
Gaweya
Tammenni
El Mushkela
La Tehremeh
Allah Yhannini
Yaani Kida
Anani
Aala Yedinek
Mawetoni
Warak
2011: Mo Bessahel
2021 : tawaab ul haq

Acting works

Series 
 Akoon Aw La (2012) MBC Production

References

1989 births
Living people
Singing talent show contestants
Rotana Records artists
21st-century Saudi Arabian women singers
Saudi Arabian actresses
Saudi Arabian film actresses
Saudi Arabian television actresses